Compost was an American jazz fusion band that released two albums for Columbia Records.

Its members were Bob Moses, Harold Vick, Jumma Santos, Jack Gregg and Jack DeJohnette. Their second album, Life Is Round, also featured Roland Prince, Ed Finney, Jeanne Lee and Lou Courtney.

Discography
1971: Compost (also titled Take Off Your Body)
1973: Life Is Round

References

American jazz ensembles
Columbia Records artists